
 
 

The Kaiserstuhl Conservation Park is a protected area located in the Australian state of South Australia in the suburb of Flaxman Valley about  north-east of the state capital of Adelaide and about  south-east of the town of Tanunda.

The conservation park consists of land in sections 531, 623, 730, 732, 733, 736, 737, 844, 859, 860, 861 and 862 in the cadastral unit of the Hundred of Moorooroo and which is an area bounded in the east by a sealed road, Tanunda Creek Road. The Heysen Trail, the long distance walking trail, passes along the west side of the conservation park.

It was proclaimed under the National Parks and Wildlife Act 1972 on 3 May 1979 for the above-mentioned parcels of land with exception to sections 859, 860, 861 and 862 which were added by proclamation on 3 December 1987. It is named after a hill called Kaiserstuhl which is located to its immediate west in the suburb of Pewsey Vale.

The conservation park is classified as an IUCN Category III protected area. In 1980, it was listed on the now-defunct Register of the National Estate.

Kaiserstuhl/Patpoori
Kaiserstuhl (literally "emperor's chair") is a mountain of about  height located in a northern part of the Mount Crawford Forest (Kaiserstuhl Native Forest Reserve) in the locality of Pewsey Vale. It was named by geologist Joseph Menge after the Kaiserstuhl mountain range near Freiburg in southwestern Germany, a famous winegrowing region. It is dual-named with the Aboriginal name Patpoori. The German name was changed to Mount Kitchener in 1918, but has since been changed back.

References

External links
 Kaiserstuhl Conservation Park official webpage
Kaiserstuhl Conservation Park webpage on protected planet

Conservation parks of South Australia
Protected areas established in 1979
1979 establishments in Australia
South Australian places listed on the defunct Register of the National Estate